Regional elections were held in some regions of Italy during 2003. These included:

Friuli-Venezia Giulia on 8 June
Aosta Valley on 8 June
Trentino-Alto Adige on 28 October

Elections in Italian regions
2003 elections in Italy